This is a list of listed buildings in the parish of Carmunnock in South Lanarkshire, Scotland (the properties are within the present boundaries of Rutherglen).

There are several listed buildings within the village of Carmunnock itself; these are shown in the List of listed buildings in Glasgow articles (entries across several sub-lists).

List 

|}

Key

Notes

References
 All entries, addresses and coordinates are based on data from Historic Scotland. This data falls under the Open Government Licence

Carmunnock
Rutherglen
 List Car